Helmuth Holzinger (May 15, 1928 – October 1, 1992) was an Austrian entomologist. He was born in Vienna and died there., In 1953, he married Ruth Raffael, a painter, who painted all plates of his monograph. In 1972, he became editor of the Zeitschrift der Arbeitsgemeinschaft der österreichischen Entomologen, where nearly all his publications would be published.

Holzinger specialized in the study of Heliconius and became a world-renowned specialist publishing his works mainly in German but also in English.

After his death, his huge monograph on the genus Heliconius was published by Sciences Nat. His collection of about 2900 specimens is now at Naturhistorisches Museum, Vienna.

Species named after Holzinger 
 Bothriocera holzingeri O'Brien 2006
 Heliconius numata holzingeri K. Brown & Fernández Yepez, 1976
 Phaeostigma holzingeri Rausch & Aspock, 1993

List of taxa described 
Holzinger never described a taxon alone, his name was nearly always associated with his wife's.
 Eueides eanes koenigi Holzinger & Holzinger, 1992
 Eueides tales franciscus Brown & Holzinger, 1973
 Heliconius c. c. f. tenebrosa Holzinger & Holzinger, 1968
 Heliconius c. g. f. flavissima Holzinger & Holzinger, 1968
 Heliconius c. g. f. gerstneri Holzinger & Holzinger, 1968
 Heliconius c. g. f. pseudoweymeri Holzinger & Holzinger, 1968
 Heliconius c. gerstneri f. denhezi Holzinger & Holzinger, 1968
 Heliconius cydno cydnides f. semicydnides Holzinger & Holzinger, 1968
 Heliconius demeter ucayalensis Holzinger & Holzinger, 1975
 Heliconius hecuba creusa Holzinger & Holzinger, 1989
 Heliconius xanthocles cleoxanthe Holzinger & Holzinger, 1971
 Heliconius xanthocles hippocrene Holzinger & Brown, 1982
 Heliconius xanthocles napoensis Holzinger & Brown, 1982
 Heliconius xanthocles rindgei Holzinger & Brown, 1982
 Heliconius xanthocles zamora Holzinger & Brown, 1982
 Zygaena (Mesembrynus) cynarae picena Holzinger & Holzinger, 1979

References 

1928 births
1992 deaths
Austrian lepidopterists
Scientists from Vienna
20th-century Austrian zoologists